James McBride may refer to:

James McBride (footballer) (1873–1899), early Liverpool F.C. player
James McBride (pioneer) (1788–1859), American settler & amateur scientist
James McBride (politician) (1802–1875), American politician and doctor in Oregon
James McBride (writer) (born 1957), American writer & musician
James H. McBride (1814–1864), Confederate general in the American Civil War
Jim McBride (born 1941), American television and film director, film producer, and screenwriter
Jim McBride (Wyoming politician) (born 1948), former Wyoming Superintendent of Public Instruction
Jim McBride or Mr. Skin
Jim McBride (songwriter) (born 1947)  American country music songwriter